Mohsenabad (also Romanized as Moḩsenābād; also known as  Muhsinābād) is a village in Garakan Rural District, in the Central District of Ashtian County, Markazi Province, Iran. At the 2006 census, its population was 545, in 121 families.

References 

Populated places in Ashtian County